Bryan Malonzo Juinio (born 10 October 1974) is a Filipino-American former professional tennis player.

Before competing professionally, Juinio was a college tennis player for Fresno State, along with twin brother Ryan. In his collegiate career, from 1992 to 1996, he amassed a then team record 105 singles wins.

Juinio played Davis Cup tennis for the Philippines in 1998 and 1999, winning six singles rubbers. He was runner-up to Paradorn Srichaphan at the 1999 Southeast Asian Games.

References

External links
 
 
 

1974 births
Living people
Filipino male tennis players
American male tennis players
American sportspeople of Filipino descent
Fresno State Bulldogs men's tennis players
Southeast Asian Games medalists in tennis
Southeast Asian Games silver medalists for the Philippines
Southeast Asian Games bronze medalists for the Philippines
Competitors at the 1997 Southeast Asian Games
Competitors at the 1999 Southeast Asian Games